The 2016 World Rugby Cup of Nations was the eleventh edition of the World Rugby Nations Cup rugby union tournament, created by World Rugby (formerly IRB). As with the previous nine tournaments, the competition took place in the Stadionul Naţional de Rugby in Bucharest, Romania.

Due to Georgia's tour of the Pacific Islands in June, the World Rugby Tbilisi Cup did not take place. Instead, this tournament featured six teams split in two pools of three, where the three European teams played the other three teams. This format was last used in 2012. Hosts Romania won the title, for the fourth time in five years. Romania finished with 13 points after beating the Argentina XV in the decisive match.

Teams

Standings

Pool A

Pool B

Fixtures

Matchday 1

Matchday 2

Week 3 (place games)

See also
World Rugby Tbilisi Cup
World Rugby Nations Cup

External links
Official Site

References

2016
2016 rugby union tournaments for national teams
International rugby union competitions hosted by Romania
2015–16 in Romanian rugby union
2015–16 in Spanish rugby union
2015–16 in Italian rugby union
2016 in Argentine rugby union
rugby union
rugby union
Sport in Bucharest